Ruricius Pompeianus (died 312 in Verona) was Praetorian prefect and Commander of cavalry and infantry under Maxentius, Western Roman Emperor. While guarding the Adige and Po Rivers with the ample and well-directed forces of the province of Venetia, Pompeianus was killed by Constantine I's troops during the desperately fought Battle of Verona (312).

Pompeianus is mentioned only briefly in two accounts of Constantine's campaign against Maxentius. In a panegyric from the year 313, he is called "Pompeianus". In the second source, also one of the Panegyrici Latini, by Nazarius, his name is given as "Ruricius". As it is clearly the same person, the conflict is usually resolved by combining the names into "Ruricius Pompeianus".

See also 

 Siege of Segusio

References

 Barnes, Timothy D. Constantine and Eusebius. Cambridge, MA: Harvard University Press, 1981. (p. 42) 
 Jones, A. H. M. Constantine and the Conversion of Europe. Buffalo: University of Toronto Press, 1978 [1948]. (p. 71)
 Odahl, Charles Matson. Constantine and the Christian Empire. New York: Routledge, 2004. (pp. 103–4) Hardcover  Paperback 

312 deaths
Ruricius
Ancient Roman generals
4th-century Romans
History of Verona
Roman generals killed in action
Praetorian prefects
Year of birth unknown